Poth Independent School District is a public school district based in Poth, Texas, that serves students in south central Wilson County

The district's colors are navy blue, white, and gold and its mascot is a Pirate named "Pirate Steve".

In 2009, the school district was rated "recognized" by the Texas Education Agency.

Schools
Superintendent is Paula Renken 
Poth High School (grades 9–12) principal is Todd Deaver
Poth Junior High School (grades 6–8) principal is Laura Kroll
Poth Elementary School (grades PK–5) principal is Laura Kroll

UIL
The school is officially a 3A, according to the University Interscholastic League. All sports and other competitions are part of UIL.

References

External links
 

School districts in Wilson County, Texas